Uzun Tappeh may refer to:
 Uzun Tappeh-ye Olya
 Uzun Tappeh-ye Sofla